Nicolas Forissier (born 17 February 1961) is a French politician of the Republicans who serves as a member of the National Assembly of France, representing the Indre department

In parliament, Forissier serves on the Finance Committee. In addition to his committee assignments, he is part of the French-Argentinian Parliamentary Friendship Group.

In the Republicans’ 2017 leadership election, Forissier endorsed Laurent Wauquiez.

References

1961 births
Living people
Politicians from Paris
Liberal Democracy (France) politicians
Union for French Democracy politicians
Union for a Popular Movement politicians
The Republicans (France) politicians
Deputies of the 12th National Assembly of the French Fifth Republic
Deputies of the 13th National Assembly of the French Fifth Republic
Deputies of the 15th National Assembly of the French Fifth Republic
Paris-Sorbonne University alumni
Sciences Po alumni
Deputies of the 16th National Assembly of the French Fifth Republic